Dexter Rides Again is a 1958 jazz album by saxophonist Dexter Gordon, assembled from his 1940s recording for the Savoy label.

Track listing
Except where otherwise noted, all songs composed by Dexter Gordon.
"Dexter's Riff" – 2:43
"Settin' the Pace, Parts 1 & 2" – 5:52
"So Easy" – 3:38
"Long Tall Dexter" – 3:00
"Dexter Rides Again" (Dexter Gordon, Bud Powell) – 3:14
"I Can't Escape from You" (Leo Robin, Richard Whiting) – 3:13
"Dexter Digs In" – 2:56
"Dexter's Minor Mad" – 2:40
"Blow Mr. Dexter" – 2:55
"Dexter's Deck" – 2:54
"Dexter's Cuttin' Out" – 3:06

Personnel
Dexter Gordon – tenor saxophone (all tracks)

Tracks 1–3, December 11, 1947.
Leo Parker – baritone saxophone 
Tadd Dameron – piano 
Curly Russell – bass
Art Blakey – drums

Tracks 4–7, January 29, 1946.
Leonard Hawkins – trumpet
Bud Powell – piano
Curly Russell – bass
Max Roach – drums

Tracks 8–11, October 30, 1945.
Sadik Hakim – piano
Gene Ramey – bass
Ed Nicholson – drums

References

1958 albums
Dexter Gordon albums
Savoy Records albums
Albums produced by Ozzie Cadena